In electrochemistry, there are two types of ideal electrode, the ideal polarizable electrode and the ideal non-polarizable electrode. Simply put, the ideal polarizable electrode is characterized by charge separation at the electrode-electrolyte boundary and is electrically equivalent to a capacitor, while the ideal non-polarizable electrode is characterized by no charge separation and is electrically equivalent to a short.

Ideal polarizable electrode 

An ideal polarizable electrode (also ideally polarizable electrode or ideally polarized electrode or IPE) is a hypothetical electrode characterized by an absence of net DC current between the two sides of the electrical double layer, i.e., no faradic current exists between the electrode surface and the electrolyte.  Any transient current that may be flowing is considered non-faradaic. The reason for this behavior is that the electrode reaction is infinitely slow, with zero exchange current density, and behaves electrically as a capacitor.

The concept of the ideal polarizability has been first introduced by F.O. Koenig in 1934.

Ideal non-polarizable electrode 

An ideal non-polarizable electrode, is a hypothetical electrode in which a faradic current can freely pass (without polarization). Its potential does not change from its equilibrium potential upon application of current. The reason for this behavior is that the electrode reaction is infinitely fast, having an infinite exchange current density, and behaves as an electrical short.

Real examples of nearly ideal electrodes 

The classical examples of the two nearly ideal types of electrodes, polarizable and non-polarizable, are the mercury droplet electrode in contact with an oxygen-free KCl solution and the silver/silver chloride electrode, respectively.

References 

Electrochemistry
Electrodes